Masamichi Satoh is a Japanese cinematographer. He was nominated for an Academy Award in the category Best Cinematography for the film Tora! Tora! Tora!.

Selected filmography 
 Tora! Tora! Tora! (1970; co-nominated with Osamu Furuya, Shinsaku Himeda and Charles F. Wheeler)

References

External links 

Possibly living people
Place of birth missing (living people)
Year of birth missing (living people)
Japanese cinematographers